Apeldoorn De Maten is a railway station located in Apeldoorn, Netherlands. The station was opened on 10 December 2006 and is located on the Amsterdam–Zutphen railway between Apeldoorn and Zutphen. The services are operated by Arriva.

History 
The station was opened on 10 December 2006.

Facilities 
The station has a single track line, with one platform. In front of the station is a car park and cycle parking.

Train services 
The following services currently call at Apeldoorn De Maten:
2x per hour local services (stoptrein) Apeldoorn - Zutphen

Bus connections 

The following bus services also stop near the station.
3 Station - Town Centre - Zutphensestraat - Station De Maten - Matenhoeve - Matenveld
4 Station - Town Centre - Zutphensestraat - Station De Maten - Matenveld - Matenhoeve

References 

2006 establishments in the Netherlands
De Maten
Railway stations on the Apeldoorn - Zutphen railway line
Railway stations opened in 2006
Railway stations in the Netherlands opened in the 21st century